This is a list of Costa Rican football clubs in international competitions. Costa Rican clubs have participated in competitive international soccer competitions since at least 1962 for the first CONCACAF Champions' Cup.

Costa Rican teams have traditionally been one of the more successful group of teams in the CONCACAF Champions League, winning the title six times and having five runners-up.

Who qualifies for CONCACAF competitions 
Since 2019, Costa Rican teams do not directly qualify for the CONCACAF Champions League. The top three finishers of the Liga FPD, the top tier of football in Costa Rica, qualify for the CONCACAF League, which is a secondary tournament. If a Costa Rican team finishes in the top six, they earn a berth into the CONCACAF Champions League.

Results by competition

FIFA Club World Cup

CONCACAF Champions' Cup / Champions League

CONCACAF League

UNCAF Interclub Cup (defunct)

CONCACAF Cup Winners Cup / Giants Cup (defunct)

Copa Interamericana (defunct)

External links
RSSSF

 
North American football clubs in international competitions